Chava Koster, the granddaughter of Dutch Holocaust survivors,  was the first woman from the Netherlands to be ordained as a rabbi. She was ordained in 1997 at the Academy for Jewish Religion in New York. Koster is now the rabbi of the Village Temple, also known as Congregation B'nai Israel, in New York City,  before joining the Village Temple, she was Associate Rabbi at Temple B'nai Abraham in Livingston, New Jersey. In 2010 she was featured in the documentary Kol Ishah: The Rabbi is a Woman, directed by Hannah Heer. In 2010 she was chosen to be the first female rabbi in Sweden; however she withdrew her name for "personal reasons."

See also
Timeline of women rabbis

References

Women rabbis
Dutch Jews
Living people
American rabbis
Year of birth missing (living people)
21st-century American Jews